A cloche (from the French for "bell") is a tableware cover, sometimes made out of silver though commercially available as glass, stoneware, marble, or other materials. They often resemble a bell, hence the name.

See also
Tableware
Masonry oven
Bell jar
Desiccator

References

Serving and dining
Tableware